Dark Shadows: The Path of Fate is a Big Finish Productions original dramatic reading based on the long-running American horror soap opera series Dark Shadows.

External links
The Path of Fate

Dark Shadows audio plays
2008 audio plays